"The Little White Cloud that Cried" is a popular song written by Johnnie Ray and published in 1951.

The biggest hit version was recorded by Ray and The Four Lads in 1951. The recording was released by Okeh Records as catalog number 6840. It was a number 2 hit on the Billboard chart that year and one side of one of the biggest two-sided hits, as the flip side, "Cry," reached number 1 on the Billboard chart.
On the Most Played Juke Box Rhythm & Blues Records chart, it went to number 6.

Other versions
 Ronnie Dove covered the song for his album  Cry in 1967 for Diamond Records.
 Stan Freberg did a parody on the Johnnie Ray song "Cry", entitled "Try", which he sings "Even Little White Clouds Do It", in reference to Ray's flip side song "Little White Cloud that Cried."
 Vera Lynn recorded a contemporary cover in Britain.
 Doris Day also recorded the song in the 1950s.
 Semprini with Rhythm Acc. recorded the song in London on March 26, 1952 as the first melody of the medley "Part 2. Hit Medley of Foxtrots" along with "I'm Lucky to Have You" and "Tell Me Why." It was released by EMI on the His Master's Voice label as catalog number B 10263.
 In 1961, The Fleetwoods released a version of the song on their album, Softly.
 Wayne Newton and his brothers recorded a version in 1961 that briefly entered the top 100 as a re-release in 1964.
 Jamie Redfern has also recorded this song.
 In 1993, Chris Isaak recorded a version for the Clint Eastwood film, A Perfect World.
 Jewish comedian Mickey Katz recorded a parody called "The Little White Knish that Cried".

References

1951 songs
Johnnie Ray songs
The Four Lads songs
Vera Lynn songs
The Fleetwoods songs
Chris Isaak songs
Songs written by Johnnie Ray
Song recordings produced by Mitch Miller
Okeh Records singles